This is a list of clubs that play Australian rules football in Queensland at the various levels of senior men's football.

National Level

Australian Football League

State Level

VFL

Queensland Australian Football League

Queensland Women's Australian Football League

Metropolitan / Country Level

Queensland Football Association

QFA Division 1
Aspley Hornets AFC
Burleigh
Caloundra AFC
Coorparoo
Maroochydore AFC
Mayne AFC
Noosa AFC
Springwood
University of Queensland AFC
Yeronga South Brisbane

QFA Division 2
Alexandra Hills AFC
Beenleigh AFC
Bond University AFC 
Coolangatta Tweed AFC
Coomera AFC
Kenmore AFC
Moreton Bay AFSC
Park Ridge AFC
Robina AFC
Victoria Point Sharks AFC

QFA Division 3
Carrara
Griffith Moorooka
Hinterland Blues AFC
Ipswich
Kedron AFC
Redcliffe
Pine Rivers
Wynnum

QFA Division 4 
Collingwood Park
Jimboomba
Maroochydore
Mayne
Morningside
Ormeau
University of Queensland
Western Magpies
Zillmere

QFA Division 5
Aspley Hornets AFC
Bribie Island
Coorparoo
Ferny Grove
Ipswich Cats
Jindalee
Springwood
Marcellin Old Boys
Yeronga South Brisbane

Queensland Women's Amateur Football League 
 Aspley Hornets
 Bond University Sharkettes
 Broadbeach Cats
 Burleigh Bombettes
 Coolangatta Tweed Heads
 Jindalee Jaguars
 Kedron Lions
 Maroochydore Roos
 Moreton Bay Lions
 Pine Rivers Swans
 University of Queensland Red Lionesses
 Yeronga South Brisbane
 Zillmere Eagles

Other Leagues

AFL Cairns
 Cairns City Lions
 Cairns Saints 
 Centrals Trinity Beach Bulldogs 
 Manunda Hawks 
 North Cairns Tigers
Port Douglas Crocs
 South Cairns Cutters
Pyramid Power

AFL Townsville
 Curra Swans
 Hermit Park Tigers 
 Thuringowa Bulldogs 
 Townsville Lions 
 University Hawks

AFL Mount Isa
 Alpurrurulam Young Guns
 Mount Isa Tigers 
 Mount Isa Buffaloes 
 Mount Isa Rovers

AFL Mackay
 Bakers Creek Tigers
 Eastern Swans 
 Mackay City Hawks 
 Mackay Magpies 
 Moranbah Bulldogs
 North Mackay Saints
 Whitsunday Sea Eagles

AFL Capricornia
 Boyne Island Tannum Sands Saints
 Rockhampton Brothers Kangaroos 
 Gladstone Mud Crabs 
 Glenmore Bulls 
 Rockhampton Panthers
 Yeppoon Swans

AFL Wide Bay
 Across The Waves Eagles
 Bay Power 
 Brothers Bulldogs 
 Hervey Bay Bombers
 Gympie Cats

AFL Darling Downs Division 1
 Coolaroo Kangaroos
 Goondiwindi Hawks 
 Highfields Lions 
 Lockyer Valley Demons 
 South Toowoomba Bombers
 Toowoomba Tigers
 University Cougars
 Warwick Redbacks

 Chinchilla Suns
 Coolaroo Kangaroos 
 Dalby Swans 
 Highfields Lions 
 South Burnett Saints
 South Toowoomba Bombers
 University Cougars
 Warwick Redbacks

See also

References

External links

Australia clubs